The Bình Triệu Bridge is a road bridge that crosses the Saigon River in Ho Chi Minh City. The road on the bridge heads out to Thủ Dầu Một.

References

Road bridges in Vietnam
Buildings and structures in Ho Chi Minh City
Transport in Ho Chi Minh City
Bridges completed in 2003